Anaptychia runcinata is a species of fungus belonging to the family Physciaceae.

It is native to Europe and Northern America.

References

Caliciales
Lichen species